Lisa Ekdahl is the debut studio album by Lisa Ekdahl, released in 1994. For the album, she was awarded a Grammis Award in the "album of the year" category.

Track listing
All songs were written by Lisa Ekdahl.
Öppna upp ditt fönster – 3:47
Benen i kors – 3:26
I tveksamhetens tid – 2:27
Jag skrek – 2:42
Åh Gud – 3:01
Sanningen i vitögat – 2:26
Det är en nåd – 1:53
Vem vet – 3:06
Jag bara vet – 2:41
Flyg vilda fågel – 2:00
På jakt efter solen – 3:37
Kunde jag vrida tiden tillbaka – 2:47
Du sålde våra hjärtan – 4:04
Ro och Lisa – 0:26 (Unlisted track)

Contributors
Lisa Ekdahl - song, guitar
Gunnar Nordén - guitar, bass, piano, accordion, arrangement
Christer Jansson - percussion, drums
Bill Öhrström - harmonica, congas
Rafael Sida – percussion
Hector Bingert - flute, soprano saxophone
Christina Wirdegren – cello
Ulf Adåker – trumpet
Marianne Flynner – choir

Charts

Certifications

References 

1994 debut albums
Lisa Ekdahl albums